Jorge Raúl Solari, (born 11 November 1941) is a former Argentine football player and manager.

Playing career

Solari, nicknamed "El Indio" ("The Indian"), played as a midfielder for several clubs in Argentina, he started his career with Newell's Old Boys in 1960. In 1962 he signed for Vélez Sársfield and in 1964 he joined River Plate. Solari represented Argentina in the 1966 FIFA World Cup. Solari left River in 1969 and had a short spell with Estudiantes de La Plata before retirement.

He also played in the Primera División de México for Club de Fútbol Torreón.

Managerial career

Solari has managed clubs all over the world, these including Atlético Junior in Colombia where he won the Apertura 1977 title, Club Renato Cesarini a club he helped to create, Newell's Old Boys, twice runners up in Argentina. In 1988–1989 he led Independiente to the Primera division championship in Argentina. He was manager of CD Tenerife in Spain and led Saudi Arabia past the group stages of the World Cup for the first and only time in their history.

After his success with Saudi Arabia he joined Yokohama Marinos in Japan.

Personal life
Solari came from a sporting family: his brother Eduardo, three of his nephews, Santiago, Esteban, and David, were also footballers, as was his grandson Augusto, while his daughter Natalia married Fernando Redondo. His niece, Liz, worked as an actress.

Managerial statistics

References

External links

Profile in Spanish

1941 births
Living people
Argentine footballers
Newell's Old Boys footballers
Club Atlético Vélez Sarsfield footballers
Club Atlético River Plate footballers
Estudiantes de La Plata footballers
Argentine Primera División players
Liga MX players
Expatriate footballers in Mexico
Argentine expatriate footballers
Argentina international footballers
1966 FIFA World Cup players
Argentine football managers
J1 League managers
1994 FIFA World Cup managers
Rosario Central managers
Club Atlético Vélez Sarsfield managers
Newell's Old Boys managers
Club Atlético Independiente managers
Barcelona S.C. managers
Aldosivi managers
Yokohama F. Marinos managers
Almagro managers
La Liga managers
CD Tenerife managers
Club América managers
Atlético Junior managers
Atlético Tucumán managers
Millonarios F.C. managers
Tiro Federal managers
Saudi Arabia national football team managers
Argentine expatriate football managers
Expatriate football managers in Chile
Expatriate football managers in Japan
Expatriate football managers in Spain
Expatriate football managers in Mexico
Expatriate football managers in Saudi Arabia
Expatriate football managers in Colombia
Expatriate football managers in Ecuador
Association football midfielders
Footballers from Buenos Aires
Huachipato managers